Armel Job (born 24 June 1948 in , Durbuy) is a Belgian writer of French language, former Director of the Institut Notre Dame Séminaire of Bastogne (INDSé).

Youth 
Armel was the third in a family of four boys. His father was a mattress-maker, then a grain dealer, and his grandfather was a horse dealer.

Armel entered the Bastogne seminary at the age of twelve, where Latin and Greek formed the basis of his education. He also studied the piano and played in the school orchestra. He was a member of the student theater.

He pursued university studies at the University of Liège. His undergraduate degree was in philosophy and letters, with graduate degrees in classical philology and secondary education.

Public life 
He was hired as a teacher of Latin and Greek at the same seminary in Bastogne where he had previously been a pupil. He taught there for twenty-three years and held various management positions from 1993 to 2010. The father of three daughters, he lives in the Bastogne region. Throughout his career he published specialized articles in the Journals of Belgian Catholic Education and continued to work on translations of Latin and Greek. He left teaching in 2010 to devote himself to his literary work. In 2011, he created the Prix du 2e roman francophone, a popular prize that immediately met with great popularity (more than 1700 readers).  

Armel Job has published about twenty novels.

Armel Job is also a playwright.

Prizes 
 2011:  of first novel, for La Femme manquée 
 2002:  for Helena Vannek
 2003 and 2011:  for Helena Vannek
 2005: Grand prix Jean-Giono for Les Fausses Innocences, a novel that unfolds in the German-speaking part of Belgium.
 2007: Prix de la personnalité Richelieu; Ce prix, attribué par l'ensemble des clubs belges et luxembourgeois du Richelieu international, récompense une personnalité pour sa contribution à la promotion de la langue et de la culture françaises.
 2010:  for Tu ne jugeras point
 2011: Prix des lycéens de littérature, he received the two prizes at stake, the prix des délégués and the  prix des lycéens for his novel published in 2009, Tu ne jugeras point.
 Prix Marcel-Thiry de la Ville de Liège for Dans la gueule de la bête 
2011: Officier de l'Ordre du .
 Chevalier de la Pléiade, ordre de la Francophonie et du dialogue des Cultures

Bibliography

Éditions Robert Laffont
1999: La Femme manquée, 
2001: Baigneuse nue sur un rocher, 
2002: Helena Vannek, 
2003: Le Conseiller du roi, 
2005: Les Fausses Innocences, 
2007: Les Mystères de Sainte Freya, 
2009: Tu ne jugeras point, 
 Prix des lycéens 2011. 
2011: Les Eaux amères, 
2012; Loin des mosquées, 
2013; Le Bon Coupable, 
2014: Dans la gueule de la bête, 
2015: De regrettables incidents, 
2016: Et je serai toujours avec toi,

L'Harmattan
1995: La reine des Spagnes, 
1998: La malédiction de l'abbé Choiron,

Éditions Weyrich
2011: La malédiction de l'abbé Choiron, reissue expanded of notes on the Walloon speech and a postface.
2016: Sept histoires pas très catholiques, short stories

Éditions Mijade 
2002: Helena Vannek,
2008: Le commandant Bill,  
2011: Les lunettes de John Lennon,

Éditions MEMOR 
2002: De la salade !,

Éditions Labor 
2004: La femme de saint Pierre,

Éditions De Boeck 
2016: La mort pour marraine, theatre

References

External links 
 Armel Job on Babelio
 Armel Job on Maison des écrivains et de la littérature
  Armel Job on Université de liège
 Armel Job toujours aussi bon on Le Journal de Montréal
 Armel Job on Espace Nord

Belgian writers in French
Prix Emmanuel Roblès recipients
Grand prix Jean Giono recipients
1948 births
University of Liège alumni
People from Durbuy
Living people